The Gomphaceae are a diverse family of fungi belonging in what is classically known as the Phallales or cladistically as the gomphoid-phalloid clade. The family has 13 genera and 287 species.

References

External links

 
Basidiomycota families